Route 172 is a short state highway in New Brunswick, New Jersey, United States. The designation runs along the southernmost leg of George Street, which is county and city-maintained the rest of the way. The highway was assigned in the 1950s, when nearby Route 18 was realigned onto a new freeway over Burnet Street in New Brunswick. Route 172 underwent a major upgrade during the reconstruction of Route 18, including a roundabout at an intersection with CR 617, and a brand-new interchange with the local lanes of Route 18.

Route description 

Route 172 begins at the intersection of Paul Robeson Boulevard (formerly Commercial Avenue prior to 2019) and George Street (CR 527, signed as CR 672) in New Brunswick. Route 172 (with CR 527 unsigned at this point) travels as a two-lane road southeast along George Street first passing residences before intersecting Bishop Street and Jones Avenue where both sides of the road become flanked by the Douglass Campus of Rutgers University. It intersects Nichol Avenue and Chapel Drive which both serve the campus. The road crosses a small stream and passes under a pedestrian overpass before reaching a roundabout marking the northern terminus of CR 617 (Ryders Lane). Route 172 turns to the north and becomes a four-lane small divided highway. A pair of jughandles serve Gibbons Drive with a signalized intersection in the center. Past this intersection, a ramp providing access for eastbound Route 172 traffic to Route 18 south exits the state highway. Route 172 crosses over the southbound lanes and the northbound express lanes of Route 18 before the state highway terminates at a signalized intersection with the northbound local lanes of Route 18.

History 
Route 172 originated as alignment of State Highway Route S-28, which was assigned in the 1927 state highway renumbering. In the 1953 renumbering, State Highway Route S-28 was reassigned as Route 18. However, just a few years after the designation of Route 18 in New Brunswick along George Street, construction of a bypass around New Brunswick began. The highway was constructed along Burnet Street, which became state-maintained by the State Highway Department. The route was completed to Route 27, and Route 18 was moved onto that alignment. The former alignment of Route 18 remained state-maintained up to the intersection with Commercial Avenue, which was eventually re-designated as Route 172.

When the New Jersey Department of Transportation started construction on upgrading the bypass, the fly-over ramp and on-ramp to and from Route 172 were torn down for construction of a new interchange along a new local/express format. The overpass was closed on October 12, 2007 to begin the construction. The bridge was built by 1955 and was replaced in 2008. On January 2, 2009, the new exit ramp for Route 18 to Route 172 was reopened to traffic.

Major intersections

See also

References

External links

New Jersey Highway Ends: Route 172
Speed Limits for State Roads: Route 172

172
Transportation in Middlesex County, New Jersey
State highways in the United States shorter than one mile